In the brain, the taenia of the fourth ventricle (lingula, tenia of fourth ventricle) are two narrow bands of white matter, one on either side, which complete the lower part of the roof of the fourth ventricle.

Each consists of a vertical and a horizontal part.
 The vertical part is continuous below the obex with the gracile nucleus, to which it is adherent by its lateral border.
 The horizontal portion extends transversely across the inferior peduncle, below the striae medullares, and roofs in the lower and posterior part of the lateral recess; it is attached by its lower margin to the inferior peduncle, and partly encloses the choroid plexus, which, however, projects beyond it like a cluster of grapes; and hence this part of the tænia has been termed the cornucopia.

Additional images

See also
 Fourth ventricle

References

Ventricular system